is J-pop artist Mayumi Iizuka's 14th album.

Exposition 
 This, Mayumi Iizuka's 14th album, is centering on the theme of "Winter," and consists of many ballads. This work is the second part of diptych with the previous contrast album, "Fight!!"
 The actual greatest hits album "Mayu Fuyu Selection" (means "Best Winter Selection by Mayumi") with 15 songs is also enclosed herewith, splendidly.
 "Akuseru" (#1), "Hatsukoi" (#11) and "Oyasumi" (#12), those of three contained by "Mayu Fuyu  Selection", are initially selected for a music album.

Track listing

CD1 - Kimi e... 
 Hanarete itemo (離れていても / If I Were Far from You)
 Lyrics: Sora Izumikawa
 Composition: Sora Izumikawa
 Arrangement: Ruka Kawata
 Forever
 Lyrics: Mayumi Iizuka
 Composition: Kohei Dojima
 Arrangement: Michiaki Kato
 Kimi e... (君へ。。。 / To You)
 Lyrics: Satomi
 Composition: Kohei Dojima
 Arrangement: Ruka Kawata
 LOL
 Lyrics: Yukako
 Composition: Kohei by Simonsayz
 Arrangement: Kohei by Simonsayz
 Fuyu ga Kite (ふゆがきて / When Winter Comes)
 Lyrics: Ruka Kawata
 Composition: Ruka Kawata
 Arrangement: Ruka Kawata
 Christmas Song for You
 Lyrics: Mayumi Iizuka
 Composition: Shinichi Asada
 Arrangement: Shinichi Asada
 Tobase!! (飛ばせ!! / Hustle!!)
 Lyrics: Sora Izumikawa
 Composition: Yuya Tsunagawa
 Arrangement: Makoto Miyazaki
 Wasurenagusa (ワスレナグサ / Forget-Me-Not)
 Lyrics: Wisao Yoshida
 Composition: Wisao Yoshida
 Arrangement: Wisao Yoshida
 Bokura no Yume (僕らの夢 / Our Dream)
 Lyrics: Mayumi Iizuka
 Composition: HoshiMai (Mayumi Iizuka)
 Arrangement: Tomoki Hasegawa
 Love
 Lyrics: Mayumi Iizuka
 Composition: Tomoki Hasegawa
 Arrangement: Tomoki Hasegawa

CD2 - Mayu Fuyu Selection 
 Akuseru (アクセル / Accele < Accelerator)
 Valentine Daisakusen (バレンタイン大作戦 / Valentine Mission)
 Strawberry Candle (ストロベリーキャンドル)
 23degrees
 Caress
 Twinkle Wink
 Yasashii Yakusoku: To My Friend (優しい約束: To My Friend / The Tender Promise: To My Friend)
 Yubikiri (ゆびきり / Hooking Our Little Fingers)
 X'mas Time Hold Me Tight
 Kikaseteyo Kimi no Koe (聴かせてよ君の声 / Give Me the Sound of Your Voice)
 Hatsukoi (はつこい / The First Love)
 Oyasumi (おやすみ / Good Night)
 Kaze no kiss (風のKiss / Windy kiss)
 Chiisana Watashi kara (小さな私から / From Tiny Me)
 Maple no Sora (メープルの空 / Maple Sky)

External links 
 Interview by Animate.tv  - December 2009

2009 albums
Mayumi Iizuka albums